Colwood is a village near Warninglid in West Sussex, England. It is the site of Colwood Manor.

References

 

Villages in West Sussex